Nissonite is a very rare copper phosphate mineral with formula: Cu2Mg2(PO4)2(OH)2·5H2O. It crystallizes in the monoclinic crystal system typically as crusts, tabular crystals, and diamond-shaped crystals. The color is blue-green.  It has a light green streak, a Mohs hardness of 2.5 and a specific gravity of 2.73. Cleavage is {100} distinct.

Nissonite was discovered in 1966 and was named after William H. Nisson (1912–1965). It is from Llanada copper mine, near Llanada, San Benito Co., California.

References

Webmineral data
Handbook of Mineralogy
Mindat with location data

Phosphate minerals
Monoclinic minerals
Minerals in space group 15